Xıdırlı is a village in the Agdam District of Azerbaijan.

History
The village was occupied by Armenian forces during the First Nagorno-Karabakh war and all its original Azerbaijani inhabitants were expelled. During its occupation, it was administrated as part of Askeran Province of the self-proclaimed Republic of Artsakh and was renamed . The village was given back to Azerbaijan on 20 November 2020 per the 2020 Nagorno-Karabakh ceasefire agreement.

Notable natives 

 Hidayat Rustamov — National Hero of Azerbaijan.

References

Populated places in Aghdam District